David Edgar Ferguson (21 March 1875 –  10 June 1920) was an Australian rules footballer who played for the Essendon Football Club in the Victorian Football League (VFL). In the first year of competition, he became one of the club's and leagues first premiership players, during the 1897 VFL season, under the captaincy of George Stuckey. Cleghorn made his debut against  in a final of the season, at the Melbourne Cricket Ground. He would play only one more game for his career, in 1898.

References

External links

Ferguson, David E.; Past Player Profiles, Essendon Football Club
 

1875 births
Essendon Football Club players
West Melbourne Football Club players
Essendon Football Club Premiership players
Australian rules footballers from Victoria (Australia)
1920 deaths
One-time VFL/AFL Premiership players